Datz is a popular restaurant and bar in South Tampa, Florida, known for its deli and gastropub offerings. It is the flagship restaurant of Datz Restaurant Group.

Since its inception, the Datz Restaurant Group has expanded to include Dough, a coffee and sweets shop that opened in 2012, and a Creole concept, Roux, that opened in Fall 2014.

The Datz Restaurant Group is currently owned by founders Suzanne and Roger Perry, and is headquartered in Tampa, FL.

History
Datz was initially modeled after Zingerman’s of Ann Arbor, Michigan, featuring large deli sandwiches, homemade potato chips, and a variety of gourmet retail products.

Datz opened on January 28, 2009, Datz. Following the Zingerman’s model, order takers were stationed downstairs, and food runners delivered food from the kitchen.

The food was very well received, but the atmosphere was not the right fit for the area. After one week, the Perrys closed the restaurant, retrained the staff, and reopened as a gastropub, featuring elevated comfort food. As of "Datz 2.0", the signature ingredient has been bacon. The bar at Datz features craft cocktails, and an eclectic menu of boutique liquors. The retail market at Datz features local, artisanal, and small-batch products. The lineup of goods can rotate depending on the season, the availability of the product, and customer request.

In April 2016, Good Morning America featured "The Cheesy Todd" burger. The burger is made with fried bacon and jalapeño mac n' cheese filled "buns" and it a popular menu item because of its stunt qualities. In recent past, the dish "Barry C.'s Stuffed Meatloaf" was featured on Food Paradise, broadcast on the Travel Channel. These appearances gained Datz local and national press.

On January 28, 2016, Datz proclaimed its 7th birthday as "National Cheat Day", a national food holiday to be celebrated by enjoying favorite foods and drinks. Datz received a proclamation from the City of Tampa for this food holiday.

References

External links
Datz
 Dough 
 South Tampa Chamber of Commerce
 City of Tampa
 Official Datz Facebook Page
 Official Datz Twitter Page
 Welcome to Tampa: A Newcomer's Eating Tour by the Food Network
 Open Table Diners' Choice Best Brunch Restaurants in America
 Tasting the City Visits Datz
 See the Sights, Color, and Flavor of Top Chefs of Tampa 2014 from The Tampa Bay Business Journal
 Trending Ways to Cool Down from The List
 Secrets of Restaurateurs from The Tampa Bay Business Journal
 21 Things You Need to Know Before Moving to Tampa
 Datz Brunch: Comfort Food With a Twist
 Bacon is the BFF of the Food World from The List
 Top 50 Restaurants in Tampa Bay
 Delta Sky Magazine

Restaurants in Tampa, Florida
2009 establishments in Florida